Clarence Harmon (born 1940) was the 44th Mayor of St. Louis (from 1997 to 2001), and the city's second African-American mayor.

Early life and education
Harmon was born to a Baptist family, and the only boy out of three children. His father was a cook on a railway, while his mother was a nurse. As a boy, Harmon was converted to Catholicism in order to attend the McBride High School, a boys-only institution. After graduating from it, he served in the US Army in the 101st Airborne Division and then got enrolled into Northeast Missouri State University (now Truman State University).

Career
Prior to serving as Mayor, Harmon had served as Metropolitan Police Department, City of St. Louis's 30th Commissioner of the St. Louis Metropolitan Police Department between the years 1991 and 1995, becoming the first African American to do so. During the time as Police Commissioner his duty was to patrol Fox Park, St. Louis, which was crime infested, but in 30 days time, the city's crime dropped 47%.

He defeated incumbent Mayor Freeman Bosley Jr. in the Democratic Primary in 1997 and went on to win election by a wide margin in the general election. Following his victory, Harmon shouted "Tear down the walls of isolation, St. Louis!", calling for the unity and racial healing. Harmon was defeated for re-election in the 2001 Democratic Primary.

References

St. Louis Public Library

1955 births
Living people
African-American mayors in Missouri
African-American people in Missouri politics
Commissioners of the St. Louis Metropolitan Police Department
Mayors of St. Louis
Webster University alumni
21st-century African-American people
20th-century African-American people